The 2019–20 season is Fortitudo Bologna's 88th in existence (6th after the re-foundation) and the new club's 1st season in the Lega Basket Serie A after the promotion in the top flight of Italian basketball.

Overview 
The promotion of Fortitudo Bologna to the highest Italian Competition is an important return as Fortitudo Bologna has been one of the most important teams in the Italian Basketball history.

After the demotion to the Legadue and immediately to the Serie A dilettanti in 2009, the team saw the bankruptcy in 2012. In 2013 the, Bologna, was re-established under the name of Fortitudo Pallacanestro Bologna 103 and slowly moved its way up to the today's Serie A after 10 years.

The promotion was achieved by winning the 2018–19 Serie A2 Basket.

The 2019-20 season was hit by the coronavirus pandemic that compelled the federation to suspend and later cancel the competition without assigning the title of winner to anyone. Fortitudo Bologna ended the championship in 8th position.

Kit 
Sponsor: Pompea

Players 
The team composition is the same as the last game played on February 9 before the interruption of the championship due to the coronavirus pandemic. Kassius Robertson was released before the official interruption of the season due to an injury procured during the FIBA AmeriCup qualification window with the Canadian national team. Jerome Dyson was hired from Virtus Roma to replace Kassius Robertson, but he never played any games.

Current roster

Depth chart

Squad changes

In

|}

Out

|}

Confirmed 

|}

Coach

Competitions

Serie A

Italian Cup 
Bologna qualified to the 2020 Italian Basketball Cup having ended the first half of the season in 6th place. They lost the semifinal against New Basket Brindisi.

References 

2019–20 in Italian basketball by club